An Ngurungaeta is a Woiwurrung head man or tribal leader of clans of the Woiwurrung tribes and Taungurung Ngurai-illum Wurrung. Ngurungaeta held the same tribal standing as an Arweet of the Bunurong and Wathaurong people. The current Ngurungaeta is Murrundindi. The term became of particular importance  as an identifier of senior men prepared to accept Anglo control in the latter part of the 19th century. It is unlikely that the term was used to express genuine recognition of senior members of traditional groups in the Melbourne area after the 1840s, following the death of Billibellary .

Identified later Ngurungaeta include:
 Bebejan – said by some Europeans to have been a member of the group alleged to have signed the 1835 treaty with John Batman
 Billibellary, (1799–1846) – said to have been  a ngurungaeta of the Wurundjeri-willam clan. An important Woiwurung man at the time of the Anglo invasion of Port Phillip.
 Simon Wonga (1824–1874) – an adolescent at the time of the Anglo occupation of Melbourne. Son of Billibellary
 William Barak (1824–1903) – last traditional ngurungaeta of the Wurundjeri-willam clan
 Robert Wandoon (1854–1908) – born at Coranderrk and said to have been anointed ngurungaeta, together with other men, by William Barak
 James Wandin (1933–2006) – claimed by some family members to be a ngurungaeta of the Wurundjeri
 Murrundindi – appointed ngurungaeta at the funeral of James Wandin in 2006

References

Wurundjeri people
Tribal chiefs